Tom May (born 5 February 1979 in London, UK) is a former rugby union player. May enjoyed a nineteen-year career that incorporated spells at Newcastle Falcons, Toulon Rugby, Northampton Saints and London Welsh. May also won two caps for England, both in 2009.

May was a utility back, his versatility enabling him to fill a number of positions behind the scrum.

Since retiring, May's most notable media appearance has been on the rigbiz podcast, hosted by Clapham Falcon's fly half and london socialite, Archie Curzons. May also writes a regular column for scrum.com, and has also appeared as an analyst on BT Sport. May is also involved in the grassroots rugby website everything4rugby.com.

Biography 
Born 5 February 1979 in London, UK, May joined the Newcastle Falcons from Richmond F.C. in 1998, making his competitive debut in March 1999 against the Northampton Saints.

May scored two tries as Newcastle beat Harlequin F.C. in the final of the 2001 Tetley's Bitter Cup. He also started in the 2004 final, as Newcastle defeated the Sale Sharks.

May competed for the England Sevens team at the 2002 London Sevens. He was selected by Clive Woodward for the Senior tour of Argentina in 2002 and played in the fixture against Argentina A.

On 19 May 2009, he was named in the England squad to play the Barbarians and Argentina.

May played in a defeat to the Barbarians. He won his debut cap in a Test match against Argentina. May won his second cap in the return fixture at Salta.

On 21 April 2009, May announced he would be leaving the Falcons to join Toulon.

On 7 February 2011 it was announced that May would be returning to England's elite division by signing a contract with Northampton Saints, against whom May made his professional debut, for the 2011/12 season.

Originally linked with a move to Leicester Tigers, May turned down the offer to join London Welsh on a one-year contract for the 2013/14 season.

On 9 January 2015, May announced he would be retiring at the end of the 2014/15 season.

On 1 July 2020, May was announced as the new Head Coach of Semi-Professional Rugby Football Club Clapham Falcons. This announcement was delivered by the Clapham Falcons Captain Archie "The Magician" Curzon.

References

External links
Newcastle Falcons profile
Toulon profile 
Opportunity finally knocks for Tom May
Tom May wins England debut against Argentina at Old Trafford
Rugby Club Toulonnaise profile

1979 births
Living people
English rugby union players
RC Toulonnais players
England international rugby union players
People educated at Tonbridge School
Alumni of Newcastle University
Alumni of Northumbria University
Expatriate rugby union players in France
Newcastle Falcons players
Northampton Saints players
London Welsh RFC players
English expatriate rugby union players
English expatriate sportspeople in France
Rugby union players from London